Hermanitas Calle (English: Soul Sisters), is a Colombian telenovela produced by Asier Aguilar for Caracol Televisión and distributed by Caracol Televisión Internacional. This based on the life of Colombian singers, Las Hermanitas Calle.

Plot 
Hermanitas Calle follows two women who struggle to overcome adversity and achieve fame with their powerful voices. In the telenovela, the women are forced to support their families with their talent in a sexist country. As a result of the prejudice, the music the women perform is not well regarded by members of the community.

Cast 
 Yuri Vargas as Fabiola Calle
 Carolina Gaitán as Nelly Calle
 Jaime Correa as Samuel Calle
 Juan Pablo Urrego as Joaquín Calle
 Gil González Hoyos as Auxilio Calle
 Katherine Escobar as Rosa Calle
 Crisanto Alonso Vargas Ramírez as Lizardo
 Patricia Tamayo as Doña Tulia
 Juliana Bautista as Young Auxilio Calle 
 Esmeralda Gil as Young Nelly Calle
 Melisa Caceres as Young Fabiola Calle 
 Carlota Llanos as Edelmira
 Edwin Maya as Walter
 Maria Cecilia Botero as Isabel
 Luis Mesa as Horacio Villa
 Julio Pachón as Libardo
 Vargasvil as Lizardo
 Fernando Arevalo as Roncancio
 Carlos Gutierrez as Fermín
 Luis Mesa as Horacio
 Variel Sánchez as Álvaro de Jesús Meléndez
 Helmer Camero as Rafael
 Ofelia Agudelo as Hermana Francisca
 Alfonso Ortíz as Monseñor Cadavid
 Alberto Cardeño as Angel Cruz
 Joavany Alvarez as Ezequiel
 Luz Estrada as Sonia
 Fernando Lara as Jaime
 Carlos Mario Echeverry as Benjamín Mejia
 Danielle Arciniegas as Julieta
 Estefanía Gómez as Profesora Oliva
 Alberto León Jaramillo as Rogelio
 Mario Duarte as Richard
 Adriana Lucía Arango García as Patricia
 María Victoria Hernández as Magnolia

Colombia broadcast

References

External links
 Official website

2015 Colombian television series debuts
2015 telenovelas
Colombian telenovelas
Spanish-language telenovelas
Caracol Televisión telenovelas
2016 Colombian television series endings
Television series based on singers and musicians
Television shows set in Medellín
Television shows set in Bogotá